The Early Singles is a French-language compilation album by Canadian singer Celine Dion, released in selected European countries in 2000. It features nineteen rare songs recorded between 1981 and 1988, including tracks from Dion's debut album, "Ce n'était qu'un rêve" and "L'amour viendra". The Early Singles also includes the Eurovision-winning song "Ne partez pas sans moi" and its instrumental version.

Background and content
The Early Singles includes all the singles and their B-sides released in France in the '80s, with the exception of "Incognito" and the 12" version of "Je ne veux pas". After many compilations of Dion's early French-language songs, The Early Singles is the first one that includes "Ce n'était qu'un rêve", "L'amour viendra" and instrumental version of "Ne partez pas sans moi". Later, the album was re-released as Les Hits. AllMusic gave it two and a half out of five stars.

Track listing

Release history

References

External links
 

2000 compilation albums
Albums produced by Eddy Marnay
Celine Dion compilation albums